Lost Witness is the English trance producer and DJ Simon Paul (also known as Si Paul), working in collaboration with songwriter Edward Barton, writer of the 1983 Jane & Barton single, "It's a Fine Day" (later covered by Opus III in 1992), and vocalist Danielle Alexander.

He also recorded under the aliases Dusk Til Dawn and The Eden Project.

A number of their singles co-written and produced by Simon Kemper were released on major electronic dance label Ministry of Sound. Some included remixes by English producer and DJ Lange. The 2002 single "Did I Dream (Song to the Siren)" is a cover of the frequently-covered "Song of the Siren" from the 1970 Tim Buckley album Starsailor.

In 2010, Lost Witness re-released the 1999 single "Red Sun Rising" (with vocals from Andrea Britton). It was given airplay by BBC Radio 1 DJ, Judge Jules. A new single, "Fade Away", was released in 2011. In June 2013, they collaborated with Sugababe and former Eurovision entrant Jade Ewen to release the track "Fly".

Discography

Singles

Remixes
 2000 ATB – "Killer"
 2000 Coldplay – "Trouble" (unofficial)
 2001 Delerium – "Innocente (Falling in Love)"
 2002 Ayumi Hamasaki – "Daybreak"
 2006 Trinity – "Like the Sun" (vs. Sassot)

References

External links
 Lost Witness official website
 Lost Witness Official Myspace
 Official page at Radikal Records website
 
 Discography at Global Trance & Dance
 Audio samples at Ministry of Sound website
 Interview at Offitsface.com

British trance music groups
English electronic music duos
Electronic dance music duos
Remixers
British record producers
Armada Music artists
English electronic musicians
Electronic dance music DJs
British DJs